HMS Dragon was a  of the Royal Navy.

She was launched on 15 December 1894 at the Laird, Son and Co. shipyard, Birkenhead, and served most of her time in the Mediterranean before being sold off in 1912.

Service history
From 1900 she was stationed in the Mediterranean as a tender to the battleship  and then to the torpedo-boat depot-ship HMS Orion (renamed Orontes from 1909).

In April 1902 she took part in gunnery and tactical exercises near Arucas, Las Palmas. Lieutenants Arthur George Kennedy Hill and Arthur Kenneth Macrorie were both listed as being in command during the autumn of 1902.

On 9 July 1912 Dragon was sold for a price of £1830.

Notes

Bibliography

 

Banshee-class destroyers
Ships built on the River Mersey
1894 ships